Herbert J. Leder (1922–1983) was a film professor at Jersey City State College's Media Arts Department.

His accomplishments were numerous in the world of film and movies. He produced the Captain Video Show, Loretta Young Show, Meet the Press, and wrote scripts for New York TV soap operas. He made a number of films such as Fiend Without a Face (1958), Pretty Boy Floyd (1960), Nine Miles to Noon (1963),
 The Frozen Dead (1966), It! (1967), and The Candy Man (1969). He taught Cinematography and Film Theory at Jersey City State College (now New Jersey City University).

References

External links 
 

1922 births
1983 deaths
American film directors
American film producers
Screenwriters from New Jersey
American television writers
American male television writers
New Jersey City University faculty
20th-century American businesspeople
20th-century American screenwriters
20th-century American male writers